Devoted to You (Chinese: 痴心的我; Pinyin: chī xīn de wǒ) also known as Then Nice Two Coutles (我已成年)  is a 1986 Hong Kong Romantic film directed by Clifton Ko, it stars Jacky Cheung, May Lo, Loletta Lee and Michael Wong (actor). The film ran in theaters from 11 April 1986 until 24 April 1989.

Plot 
Jane (Loletta Lee), born in a lower-class family, is a rebellious girl. She gets send to a famous high-class high school by her parents, she gets bullied by other students all the time. On the other hand, May (May Lo), born in a rich family, is a spoiled girl. Bullied and Isolated by her classmates, Jane keeps it all to herself. After seeing this, May pranks Jane's bullies for bullying her. Soon after school, May gets beaten up by Jane's bullies, Jane comes and rescues May from being humiliated. After that, they becomes good friends. One day, Jane and May was in a coffee shop, she dares May to get the phone number of a boy outside their coffee shop, she learns that he's called Jacky (Jacky Cheung), who comes to Hong Kong for holiday from Canada. Although May knows he has a girlfriend in Canada, May finds herself fall in love with Jacky. They spend the last day of his Hong Kong trip romantically. After Jacky went back to Canada, May decides to go to Canada to live with Jacky, only to find out Jacky really has a girlfriend, she realizes she is a fool and goes back to Hong Kong crying. Meanwhile, Jane meets a motorcyclist called Michael (Michael Wong (actor)), who is part of a gang. The fall in love with each other quickly. After Michael gets killed by some gangsters, Jane realizes the important of family love. She decides to make a fresh start to her life.

Cast 
 May Lo as May (阿美) - Rich and spoiled, falls in love with Jacky even though he has a girlfriend
 Jacky Cheung as Jacky (积奇)- Studies in Canada, went back to Hong Kong for a holiday, falls in love with May
 Loletta Lee as Jane (阿珍) - Poor and rebellious, falls in love with Michael
 Michael Wong as Michael (米高) - Falls in love with Jane, gets killed by some gangsters 
 Ku Feng as Jane's father - Grumpy and careless 
 Chiao Chiao as Jane's mother - Very protective over her daughter 
 Tin Ching as Jane's grandfather - Gives parenting advises to Jane's parents
 Timothy Zao as Jane's brother - Obey his parents, likes to watch TV
 Lau Siu-Ming as May's father -  The chairman of May's school
  as May's mother - Likes to spoil her daughter
 Priscilla Chan as Priscilla - Jacky's Canadian girlfriend
 Pamela Pak Wan-kam as Jane's teacher
 Gam Biu as School vice principal
 Teddy Yip Wing-Cho as School principal
 Bill Tung Biu as TV race course commentator
 Fruit Chan Goh as Thug
 Clifton Ko as Guy at beach (cameo)

Jacky Cheung and May Lo 
Famous Hong Kong actor and singer Jacky Cheung met his future spouse May Lo while filming this film. Once in an interview, Jacky said this film changed his life, he said "At the time I was clueless. I thought I have to take everything seriously and it had to be real. I was young at the time, so it influenced my life. I really fell in love." Jacky was unable to get out of character, and ended up dating May in real life. They got married in 1996, the couple is now blessed with two daughters.

Critical response 
On IMDb, it received an average rating of 6.2 out of 10 based on 23 reviews.

On the Chinese movie review website, Douban, it received an average rating of 7.4 out of 10 based on 1098 user reviews.

References

External links 

Devoted to You at hkcinemagic.com

1980s Cantonese-language films
Hong Kong romance films
Films directed by Clifton Ko
1980s Hong Kong films